Antabli Fountain is a water fountain in Souk Ayas in downtown Beirut, Lebanon. The fountain, originally Ottoman, became associated with the sweets and drinks prepared by the Antabli family. Ahmad Mohamad Antabli started selling sweets and drinks alongside the fountain aged 12, in 1933. It remained a popular destination in Souk Ayas until 1975.

History

An inhabitant of Beirut remembers this fountain, originally Ottoman, which became associated with the Antabli family: “A man always used to stand near that fountain. He was the elder Antabli. In front of him was a push-cart full of Arabic sweets. All kinds of people ate and drank there, standing. The Antabli Fountain, as it came to be known, made the man famous, and Souk Ayass became famous because of it.”

Ahmad Mohamad Antabli was 12 years old when he began selling things alongside the fountain. His son Adil relates: “My grandfather encouraged my father to start the venture, and taught him everything. Every morning, a wooden counter with glass side-panels was transported near the fountain. In it, bowls of muhalabiyeh, meghli and kashtaliyeh were displayed on a bed of crushed ice. A big block of ice was also placed inside the fountain to keep the jellab, the lemonade and the juices cool… In the evening everything was taken away again until early next morning.”

References 

Tourist attractions in Beirut
Fountains in Lebanon